Akram Khan (born 10 October 1970) is an Indian politician, a leader of the Indian National Congress (INC) and the former minister of state for Home, Govt. of Haryana. He became the Deputy Speaker of Haryana for the first time in March 2010. In the Haryana assembly elections of 2009, he became the lone MLA of BSP in Haryana. Since 1966, he is the first Muslim deputy speaker of Haryana.

Early life
Akram Khan was born to Chaudhri Mohammed Aslam Khan, a renowned politician, in the village of Khizri situated at northern tip of the Yamunanagar district of Haryana, India. His grandfather Chaudhri Abdul Rashid Khan was also an eminent leader of northern Haryana.
He is an alumnus of Colonel Brown Cambridge School, Dehradun. He did his B.A. at Panjab University, Chandigarh.

Political career
After the death of his father he continued the family tradition and joined Indian National Congress but he was denied the ticket from Chhachhrauli in 1996 elections. He became a rebel and contested election as an independent and became the member of Haryana Vidhan Sabha in 1996 for the first time. In year 1998-1999 he became the Chairman of Housing Board, Haryana in Bansi Lal Government. In the same Government he became the Minister of State for Home for the year 1999-2000. In 2000 Vidhan Sabha Elections he contested as an independent candidate from Chhachhrauli but got defeated. Despite the defeat he became the Chairman of Haryana Dairy Development & Coop. Federation Ltd for 2000-2004 due to his closeness to the then Chief Minister of Haryana Om Prakash Chautala. In the same Government he was appointed Chairman of Haryana State Electronics Development Corporation Ltd. (HARTRON) in 2004-2005. In 2005 elections he contested elections for the first time on a party ticket through INLD but he lost again to his nearest rival. The years 2005-2009 were the only years of his political career when he was not holding any position in Govt. of Haryana. In year 2007, he switched to Bahujan Samaj Party and contested 2009 elections on their ticket from Jagadhri and won with a huge margin. As he is the only MLA of BSP in Haryana, so the anti-defection law is not valid for him. So, he supported the coalition Government of Hooda and became the first Muslim Deputy Speaker of Haryana Vidhan Sabha on 5 March 2010.
He then contested election in 2014 but he lost the elections due to Modi wave. But still he was a runner up securing 40,047 votes.

On 20 December 2018, he was expelled from Bahujan Samaj Party (BSP) for going against party policy. He, on next day, with his supporters held a press conference, where his supporters who were 7 Zila Parishad members resigned from their party memberships thereby weakening the party.

Akram Khan on 29 March 2019, joined Indian National Congress in presence of Sh. Rahul Gandhi Ji President of Indian National Congress and Kumari Selja Ji, Rajya Sabha Member (2014-2020).

References

1970 births
Living people
Indian Muslims
Panjab University alumni
People from Yamunanagar district
Bahujan Samaj Party politicians from Haryana
Deputy Speakers of the Haryana Legislative Assembly
Indian National Congress politicians
Indian National Lok Dal politicians